is a Japanese manga series written by Yukito Ayatsuji and illustrated by Noriko Sasaki. It was serialized in Shogakukan's Monthly Ikki from December 2004 to April 2006, with its chapters collected in two wide-ban volumes.

Publication
Tsukidate no Satsujin is written by Yukito Ayatsuji and illustrated by Noriko Sasaki. It was serialized in Shogakukan's Monthly Ikki from December 25, 2004, to April 25, 2006. Shogakukan collected its chapters in two wide-ban volumes, released on August 10, 2005, and July 28, 2006. Shogakukan re-published it in two tankōbon volumes released on January 30, 2009. Shogakukan re-published it again in two bunkoban volumes on January 13, 2017.

Volume list

Reception
Tsukidate no Satsujin was one of the Jury Recommended Works at the 10th Japan Media Arts Festival in 2006.

Notes

References

Further reading

External links
Official website at Ikki Paradise 

Mystery anime and manga
Railway culture in Japan
Seinen manga
Shogakukan manga